Luiz Severo Júnior (born 24 July 1989), known as Júnior Viçosa, is a Brazilian professional footballer who plays as a striker for Brasil de Pelotas.

Career
Júnior Viçosa began his career at ASA of Alagoas. Before turning professional, he spent months on the basis of Angrense divisions of Portugal for testing. After a distinguished team of Alagoas for the main team, 1st division clubs of Brazil became interested in his football. But the Grêmio ran ahead. On September 23, 2010, Jackson landed in Porto Alegre with the manager to sign a loan contract until the end of the year with the Grêmio, which has the option to termination.

In his debut with Grêmio's shirt, he scored the equalizing goal when the game was 1-0 to Cruzeiro. The match played at the Olympic Stadium ended 2-1 in Porto Alegre in Rio Grande do Sul facing the team, and the tie-breaking goal scored by Jonas.

Career statistics

Honours

Club
ASA
 Campeonato Alagoano: 2009

Goiás
 Campeonato Goiano: 2012, 2013
 Campeonato Brasileiro Série B: 2012

Atlético Goianiense
 Campeonato Goiano: 2014
 Campeonato Brasileiro Série B: 2016

Individual
 Campeonato Goiano Top goalscorer: 2014

References

External links

1989 births
Living people
Brazilian footballers
Association football forwards
Campeonato Brasileiro Série A players
Campeonato Brasileiro Série B players
Campeonato Brasileiro Série C players
Swiss Challenge League players
Grêmio Foot-Ball Porto Alegrense players
Sport Club do Recife players
Goiás Esporte Clube players
Atlético Clube Goianiense players
FC Chiasso players
América Futebol Clube (MG) players
Esporte Clube Vitória players
Grêmio Esportivo Brasil players
Brazilian expatriate footballers
Brazilian expatriate sportspeople in Switzerland
Expatriate footballers in Switzerland
Sportspeople from Alagoas